Morschwiller-le-Bas is a commune in the Haut-Rhin department in Alsace in north-eastern France. It forms part of the Mulhouse Alsace Agglomération, the inter-communal local government body for the Mulhouse conurbation.

Composer and organist Julien Koszul (1844–1927), grandfather to both mathematician Jean-Louis Koszul and composer Henri Dutilleux, was born in Morschwiller-le-Bas.

See also
 Communes of the Haut-Rhin département

References

Communes of Haut-Rhin